Niguldipine is a calcium channel blocker and α1-adrenergic receptor antagonist.

References 

4-Phenylpiperidines
Alpha-1 blockers
Calcium channel blockers
Carboxylate esters
Dihydropyridines
Nitrobenzenes